The Little Red Schoolhouse is a historic one-room schoolhouse located a few miles northeast of Nogales, Arizona, in the community of Beyerville. Opened in 1921 to serve the children of local farmers and ranchers, the Little Red Schoolhouse is the only one remaining of approximately two dozen red schoolhouses built in the Santa Cruz River valley in the 1920s.

Next to the historic Little Red Schoolhouse is the modern Little Red Schoolhouse elementary school, a larger K–8 facility that replaced the original schoolhouse.

See also

 Little Red Schoolhouse (Scottsdale, Arizona)
 The Little Outfit Schoolhouse
 Ranch school

References

Ranch schools
Schools in Santa Cruz County, Arizona
School buildings completed in 1921
1921 establishments in Arizona
History of Santa Cruz County, Arizona
One-room schoolhouses in Arizona